A huntsman is a hunter, especially a fox hunter.

Huntsman or huntsmen or variation, may also refer to:

People  
 Huntsman (surname)
 Huntsmen (military), a medieval and renaissance soldier type

Characters
 Huntsman (American Dragon: Jake Long), a character on American Dragon: Jake Long
  Huntsman (Doctor Who), Wolf Weed Whipper in the Doctor Who serial "The Creature From the Pit", 1979
 Huntsman, Image Comics, A hero created by Chris Claremont
 Huntsman (Weapon XII), Marvel Comics X-Men villain
 Huntsman (Cephalus), Marvel Comics servant of Zeus
 Huntsman (Heroic Publishing), a member of the League of Champions
 The Huntsman (Freakazoid), a character on Freakazoid
 Wild Huntsman (comics), a heroic character from DC Comics 
 Huntsman (Snow White), a character from the Grimm fairy tale Snow White
 The Huntsman (Once Upon a Time), a fictional character from the ABC television series Once Upon a Time

Places  
 Huntsman, neighborhood in Springfield, Virginia
 Lake Huntsman, a reservoir in Tasmania, Australia

Facilities and structures
 Huntsman (chemical plant), a major Australian chemical plant of the Huntsman Corporation
 Huntsman Lake Power Station, Lake Huntsman, Tasmania, Australia
 Huntsman Cancer Institute, world-class cancer research center named after Jon and Karen Huntsman on the University of Utah Campus
 Jon M. Huntsman Center, the University of Utah's main sports arena, named after Jon M. Huntsman, Sr.
 Jon M. Huntsman, Sr. Hall, main hall for the Wharton School of the University of Pennsylvania

Animals  
 Huntsman spider, a large spider commonly found in Australia
 The Huntsman, a racehorse who won the 1862 Grand National steeplechase run

Arts and entertainment

Literature
 Huntsman (series), a young adult science fiction series written by Douglas Hill
 The Huntsman, a 1983 novel by Douglas Hill in the YA series Huntsman
 "The Huntsman" (short story), an 1885 short story by Anton Chekhov

Film
 Snow White and the Huntsman, a 2012 film
 The Huntsman: Winter's War, a 2016 film

Court functions 
 Grand Huntsman of France
 Grand Huntsman of Brabant

Groups, companies, organizations  
 Huntsman Corporation, an American multinational manufacturer and marketer of chemical products
 Huntsman Program in International Studies and Business
 Jon M. Huntsman School of Business, the School of Business at Utah State University
 H. Huntsman & Sons, a Savile Row tailor
 Chicago Huntsmen, an eSports team for Call of Duty

Other uses 
 Huntsman cheese, a combination of Double Gloucester and Stilton

See also

 
 
 
 Huntress (disambiguation)
 Hunter (disambiguation)
 Hunt (disambiguation)
 Man (disambiguation)